Bosnian Austrians are citizens of Austria whose ancestry can be traced to Bosnia and Herzegovina. The vast majority of Bosnians emigrated to Austria during and after the Bosnian War of the 1990s, though a large number emigrated as early as the 19th century.

Communities
The largest Bosnian communities in Austria are found in Graz, Linz and Wels; followed by Salzburg, Villach, Klagenfurt and Vienna.

A historic moment for the Bosnians of Austria took place on 29 June 2013 in the city of Wels. The Trg Bošnjaka (Platz der Bosniaken) was unveiled in front of the Bosnian Austrian Cultural Center as a token of appreciation and the good cooperation between Bosnian Austrians and the city administration.

Demographics
According to the population census for 2014 conducted by "Statistik Austria" (Austrian federal agency for statistics), the total number of people of Bosnian descent in Austria was 155,050 and they comprised 1.9% of the total population. As of 2017, some 41,000 Bosnians lived in Vienna.

Notable people 
Adis Jasic, footballer
 Alen Orman, footballer
 Alma Zadić, lawyer and politician of the Green Party who has been serving as Minister of Justice
 Amer Hrustanović, wrestler 
 Anel Hadžić, footballer
 Azra Aksamija,  artist and architectural historian
 Boris Nemšić, Businessman and the former CEO of Telekom Austria
 Deniz Mujić, footballer
 Edin Salkić, handball player
 Emir Dilaver, footballer
 Enisa Kadić, Miss Austria 2013
 Haris Bukva, footballer
 Irfan Škiljan, inventor of IrfanView
 Ivona Dadic, track and field athlete of Bosnian Croat descent.
 Madita, singer 
 Mirela Dedić,  handball player
Muharem Huskovic, footballer
 Nina Kusturica, film director
 Sanel Kuljić, footballer
 Smail Balić, historian
 Sena Jurinac, soprano
 Zlatko Junuzović, footballer

See also
 Diaspora studies
 Bosniaks
 Bosnians
 Die Bosniaken Kommen

References

Ethnic groups in Austria
Bosniak diaspora
Austrian